Arthur Bobby Lee Darwin (born February 16, 1943) is an American professional baseball scout and a former Major League Baseball pitcher and outfielder who played for the Los Angeles Angels, Los Angeles Dodgers (-), Minnesota Twins (-), Milwaukee Brewers (1975-), Boston Red Sox (1976-) and Chicago Cubs (1977).

Darwin began his career as a right-handed pitcher, appearing in one game with the Angels at the age of 19. After spending most of the next decade in the minor leagues, during which time he switched positions to center field, Darwin established himself as a Major League player with the Twins in 1972. In his first three full seasons (1972-), Darwin hit 65 home runs and drove in 264 runs, finishing in the top ten in the American League in home runs and runs batted in for both 1972 and 1974, while also leading the American League in strikeouts in all three of those seasons. He was dealt from the Twins to the Brewers for Johnny Briggs on June 14, 1975. He finished his career as a part-time player in 1976 and 1977.

Darwin finished his pro career after the 1978 season. In 1983, he became a scout for the Dodgers, and was honored for longtime service with the club in 2010.

References

External links
, or Baseball Gauge, or Bobby Darwin - BaseballBiography.com, or Pura Pelota (Venezuelan Winter League)

1943 births
Living people
African-American baseball players
Águilas Cibaeñas players
American expatriate baseball players in the Dominican Republic
Águilas del Zulia players
Alijadores de Tampico players
American expatriate baseball players in Mexico
Bakersfield Dodgers players
Baseball players from Los Angeles
Boston Red Sox players
Chicago Cubs players
Elmira Pioneers players
Florida Instructional League Orioles players
Hawaii Islanders players
Los Angeles Angels players
Los Angeles Dodgers players
Los Angeles Dodgers scouts
Major League Baseball outfielders
Major League Baseball scouts
Milwaukee Brewers players
Minnesota Twins players
Navegantes del Magallanes players
American expatriate baseball players in Venezuela
San Jose Bees players
Spokane Indians players
Stockton Ports players
Wichita Aeros players
21st-century African-American people
20th-century African-American sportspeople